Heimsheim is a town in the Enz district, in Baden-Württemberg, Germany.

History 
Heimsheim was given the official status of a township by the County Palatine of Tübingen at the start of the 14th century. Early in the 16th century, the town came into the possession of the Duchy of Württemberg. The town remained under Leonberg when the district was recreated on 1 October 1938. After World War II, the town became part of the Stuttgart Metropolitan Region and expanded to the north and east, in the direction of the Bundesautobahn 8. On 1 January 1973, Heimsheim  the Enz district.

Geography 

It is physically located in the foothills of the Black Forest, in the Heckengäu, a region geology is characterized by karstified and wooded muschelkalk hills. The primary watercourse in Heimsheim is the Kotzenbach (also called the Zieselbach), which drains into the Würm to the southwest. The river flows through a shallow valley carved into the Upper Buntsandstein near Heimsheim's center, and along Enz district's western edge. The Kotzenbach is also the location of Heimsheim's lowest elevation,  NN. The highest elevation, is the top of a hill on the border with Renningen, in the Böblingen district.

Politics 
The local council has 14 members. Elections were held in 2014:

FWV Freie Wählervereinigung (Free voters)         4 seats
BfH Bürger für Heimsheim (Citizens for Heimsheim) 3 seats
CDU                                               3 seats
SPD                                               3 seats
UWV Unabhängige Wählervereinigung (Independent voters association)  1 seat

Coat of arms 
The coat of arms of Heimsheim depicts two golden ears of wheat upon an emerald field. This pattern dates back to 1456 and has been the most consistently used coat of arms used by the township. There have, however, been some variants used. From 1585 to 1902, a pattern that replaced the wheat with arrows was sometimes used, as was another with three ears of wheat. In 1596, a pattern of the coat of arms that replaced the emerald field with a yellow one was introduced. The original, default coat of arms was confirmed by the Federal Ministry of the Interior on 25 July 1966.

References

External links 

 Official website (in German)

Enzkreis
Württemberg